The following is a list of radio stations in  Nunavut .

Stations in Nunavut with call letters beginning with CB and those using call letters CFFB are owned and operated by the Canadian Broadcasting Corporation. The others are owned and operated by local community groups, with the exception of CIQA-FM Iqaluit, the Weatheradio Canada station operated by Environment and Climate Change Canada for the area, and CKIQ-FM and CKGC-FM in Iqaluit, the only commercial radio stations in Nunavut.

See also 
 Lists of radio stations in North and Central America

External links
Canadian Communications Foundation - History of Radio stations in Nunavut

Nunavut
Radio